František Ševinský (born 31 March 1979 in Prague) is a retired Czech footballer. His position is defender. He last played for Czech club FK Mladá Boleslav.

Ševinský represented his country at youth level.

Honours

Club

 FC Viktoria Plzeň
 Czech Cup: 2010

External links
 
 

1979 births
Living people
Czech footballers
Czech First League players
FC Viktoria Plzeň players
FK Mladá Boleslav players
FK Drnovice players
Association football defenders
SK Sparta Krč players
Footballers from Prague